Govind Raghuchandra Acharya is an Indian politician and member of the Maharashtrawadi Gomantak Party. Acharya is a member of the Goa Legislative Assembly from the Poinguinim constituency in South Goa district.

References 

People from South Goa district
Maharashtrawadi Gomantak Party politicians
Shiv Sena politicians
Indian National Congress politicians from Goa
Members of the Goa Legislative Assembly
Living people
Year of birth missing (living people)